Kulliyyah of Medicine of International Islamic University Malaysia is a publicly funded medical institution located in Kuantan, Pahang.

The long-term strategic plan of the Kulliyyah of Medicine is to establish its own teaching hospital with Islam as its foundation.

The undergraduate medical course is currently undertaken at the Kuantan campus, Hospital Tengku Ampuan Afzan (HTAA), Hospital Sultan Haji Ahmad Shah, and Hospital Pekan. These hospitals are located in Pahang and are used for teaching during the clinical phase of the course. The use of the hospital is sealed by the Memorandum of Understanding signed with the Ministry of Health Malaysia (MOH) in 1997 to cater for the needs of undergraduate and postgraduate teaching in the future.

Kulliyyah of Medicine has over 120 full-time qualified academic staff. They are recognised as specialists and sub-specialists in some clinical specialities nationally. The current infrastructure in terms of hospitals and healthcare facilities are inadequate to support this expansion and therefore there is a need for a hospital for the Kulliyyah for which IIUM Hospital is envisaged to fill in the gap.

Kulliyyah of Medicine has now expanded into postgraduate activities. There are Master's and PhD programmes in basic medical sciences and in clinical postgraduate programmes supervised by the conjoint boards of each speciality. The basic requirements for clinical postgraduate programmes are the existence of adequate infrastructure of sufficient standard and the clinical expertise that will run the course. The latter requires the existence of a sufficient number of experienced clinicians to supervise the students during the training. The provision of the necessary infrastructure and the need for expansion of the teaching staff require Kulliyyah to acquire its own teaching hospital and therefore IIUM Hospital will be required to bridge this gap.

Kulliyyah of Medicine is located in Pahang with a population of nearly 1.6 million people. This region houses many expatriates and local professionals in the petrochemical and automotive industries and this represents a specific need for medical expertise. A tertiary teaching hospital is needed to serve this area with the various needs of the population. IIUM Hospital will serve this need and be a centre of excellence. This will be in line with the national plan to develop ECER and SEZ within the Pahang and southern Terengganu region.

Kulliyyah of Medicine uses Hospital Tuanku Ampuan Afzan (HTAA) in Pahang as the main teaching hospital. The total number of beds in the nine government hospitals in the state is 1,585, 8 private hospitals with 143 beds and 1 estate hospital with 10 beds. The bed-to-population ratio for Pahang is 1:773, with the ratio in Terengganu at 1:837. For comparison, the ratio in Klang Valley is 1:232, Penang 1:349, Johor 1:473 and the national average is 1:496. The WHO recommended average is 1:400 and there is a need to increase the number of beds for the people in this region.

Kulliyyah of Medicine in Kuantan uses HTAA as the main teaching hospital for the university. HTAA is a service hospital with basic teaching facilities. HTAA is also used by other Kulliyyahs as well as by local private learning institutions for nursing, allied health science and pharmacy students.

References 

https://www.iium.edu.my/kulliyyah/kom

Medical schools in Malaysia
Medical and health organisations based in Malaysia
Faculties of the International Islamic University Malaysia
Universities and colleges in Pahang
Educational institutions established in 1999
1999 establishments in Malaysia